"The Globe" is a 1991 song by British electronic group Big Audio Dynamite II. It was released as a single in the United States and is taken from their album The Globe. It samples the 1981 song "Should I Stay or Should I Go", which was written by Big Audio Dynamite II singer Mick Jones during his tenure with The Clash, and Lionel Richie's 1983 single, "All Night Long (All Night)".

The song spent 10 weeks on the Billboard Hot 100, peaking at No. 72 in March 1992.

Music video 
A music video for the single edit of the song was released in 1991 through Sony BMG Music Entertainment. It was directed by Nic Hofmeyr and Ralph Ziman. The video features the band playing at the Crossroads of the World tower in Los Angeles, inter-spliced with stock footage of the city, its nightlife and scenery, and a recording of the band performing on stage.

Track listing
"The Globe" (Single Edit) – 3:50
"The Globe" (Single Remix Edit) – 4:05 *
"The Globe" (12" Mix) – 7:42 *
"The Globe" (Dub Version) – 5:43 *
"The Globe" (By The Orb) – 9:22 **
"The Globe" (Instrumental) – 4:54 ***

* Remix by Danny Rampling, Engineer: Marcus Draws, Programmer: Andy Whitmore, Percussion: Joe Beckett.
** Remix and additional production by The Orb.
*** Mixed by Mick Jones and Andre Shapps.

Personnel
Mick Jones – vocals
Nick Hawkins – guitars
Gary Stonadge – bass guitar
Chris Kavanagh – drums

Charts

Weekly charts

Year-end charts

Certifications

References

1991 songs
1991 singles
Big Audio Dynamite songs
Songs written by Mick Jones (The Clash)
Song recordings produced by Mick Jones (The Clash)
Columbia Records singles